Tolmachev Dol (Tolmachev Plateau) is a volcanic highland located in the southern part of Kamchatka Peninsula, Russia, northeast of Opala volcano. The cones and lava fields cover a broad area around Lake Tolmachev.

Tolmachev Dol is a large volcanic field, consisting of cinder cones and lava flows (GVP). It has principally erupted andesite and dacite.

Activity in the volcanic field commenced during the Pleistocene (GVP). This ash was formerly attributed to the Opala volcano. 300 CE, the last eruption took place (GVP).

See also 
 List of volcanoes in Russia

Footnotes

References 
 

Volcanoes of the Kamchatka Peninsula
Cinder cones
Lava plateaus
Holocene volcanoes
Holocene Asia
Lava fields